The Petorca River is a river of Chile. The catchment of Petorca River has been the subject of a severe drought the last decades. Lorena Donaire of the environmental organisation Modatima recalls 1985 as the first year Petorca River dried.

See also
List of rivers of Chile

References

 EVALUACION DE LOS RECURSOS HIDRICOS SUPERFICIALES EN LA CUENCA DEL RIO BIO BIO

Rivers of Chile
Rivers of Valparaíso Region
Petorca